Luma Arles is an arts center in Arles, France, featuring a 15,000 square meter tower building designed by the Canadian-American architect Frank Gehry for the LUMA Foundation. For the building Gehry took some of his inspiration from the post-impressionist painter Vincent van Gogh hoping to catch the light Dutch artist sought in the South of France, specifically as in Starry Night which was painted in Arles in 1889. The skin of the building features 11,000 angled reflective stainless steel panels.

The center is the brainchild of the Swiss art collector, art patron, documentary producer, impresario, and businesswoman Maja Hoffmann who heads the foundation and collaborated with Gehrys on the tower's genesis. 
The building includes exhibition spaces, workshops, a library, an auditorium with 150 seats, and a café.

References

External links
 

Skyscrapers in France
2021 establishments in France
Buildings and structures completed in 2021
Buildings and structures in Arles
21st-century architecture in France